Metaplan is an international management consulting firm, advising companies on how to manage the process of strategy development.

Metaplan is well known for developing the Metaplan technique. This discursive approach is a method for collecting and processing ideas and opinions when a group of people are working together. It is frequently used in clinical practices, research, and business contexts. The technique is taught in Metaplan's Leadership & Organization Academy.

For the Metaplan technique, all people in the group write down their own ideas or opinions on a topic, one idea on one card. In the Brainstorming process it is important that ideas are not judged. Then  all cards are collected and fixed on a pin board. Only now the ideas are processed. The cards are organized according to categories and ranked. The clusters of ideas may yield insights or reveal connections people were not aware of.

Apart from the visual technique described above, the method often involves the performance of professional discussion butlers, known as moderators. Using the technique, the moderator structures the thinking processes within the context of group work.

The method was initiated by Eberhard Schnelle in Hamburg, Germany. He also founded Metaplan consulting, i.e. the Metaplan Corporation for Planning and Organization (German: Metaplan Gesellschaft für Planung und Organisation).

References

External links
 Metaplan Website

Companies based in Hamburg
International management consulting firms
Management consulting firms of Germany